George Denton may refer to:

 George K. Denton (1864–1926), U.S. Representative from Indiana
 George Chardin Denton (1851–1928), British colonial administrator and military officer
 George H. Denton (born 1939), professor of geology
 George Denton (naturalist) (1833–1910), driving force behind the Wellington Acclimatisation Society in New Zealand